ArtFacts.Net is the world's largest online art database, founded in 2001 by Stine Albertsen and Marek Claassen. The company is registered as a Limited Company (Ltd.) in Great Britain. ArtFacts has been collecting, archiving, publishing and analyzing data on the art market worldwide since the company was founded, for example in the so-called Artist Ranking

History 
Marek Claassen developed in cooperation with the Federal Association of German Galleries and Art Dealers e. V. and the Art Cologne trade fair database-driven websites, and systems for quickly creating exhibition catalogues. This was later done with GISI (Gallery Information System on the Internet) a virtual exhibition and archive system for galleries in Berlin, the forerunner of today's Artfacts art platform. Stine Albertsen (born 1978 in Copenhagen ) a co-founder of Artfacts, had initially worked for the Danish Embassy in Berlin before co-founding Artfacts in 2001.

With the founding of ArtFacts in 2001, the company began to systematically collect data on the (primary) art market . The focus is on the exhibition activities of artists; institutions (art associations, museums or art galleries, etc.). And galleries report their individual and group exhibitions to ArtFacts after which ArtFacts aggregates them for the respective artists and exhibition institutions into an exhibition history. In 2004, the so-called ArtFacts Ranking was introduced, which measures the artists' exhibition activities and illustrates them with graphs. The years before the global financial crisis caused the art market and the number of galleries to grow rapidly worldwide. In this context, ArtFacts developed into an international art market platform with 900,000 unique visitors per month.

With the financial market crisis, the art market also got into trouble, and as a result many galleries closed or cut their costs. Galleries, which were previously ArtFacts' main customers, declined, and thereby endangered the company not only financially but also in terms of collecting exhibition data. With the introduction of new memberships, for example for artists, curators or collectors, the situation could be compensated for and the reach into the art world even increased. With the expansion of an international team of editors, the company was able to verify the information received.

Technological change on the Internet and in end devices (smartphones, tablets, etc.) led to the adaptation of artifacts to today's standards.

Artist ranking 

ArtFacts relates artists to one another using a complex algorithm that assumes that each exhibition carries a different weight in the art world. So e.g. For example, an exhibition at the Museum of Modern Art in New York is valued higher than one at a rural art club with few visitors. In addition to the exhibition activity, the algorithm also evaluates the reach, the quality of the institutions or collections and awards points. The accumulated points are displayed graphically so that the user can follow and compare the development of artists.

The theoretical background of this approach are, for example, the cultural-sociological studies of Pierre Bourdieu or Georg Franck 's book Ökonomie der Aufmerksamkeit from 1998. The ranking is controversially discussed in the art world: for example, the business magazine Capital publishes the top 100 artists once a year, based on data from Artfacts. Critically, it is seen that the depiction usually gives more weight to contemporaries and younger artists than to classics like Renoir or Rembrandt. But artists, too, repeatedly come up against the reduction of their activity to a mathematical depiction.

"Editorial Team" 
While many databases on the Internet are created by so-called Webcrawle (scraping), the ArtFacts database includes information on the art market that has been input and checked by people. A team of international editors has checked all reports since the company was founded. This reduces negative effects on the artist ranking or the rating of galleries, for example through social bots. At the beginning of April 2021, the database contained 888,381 exhibitions, 23,212 galleries and 717,845 artists from a total of 192 countries.

External links 

 Artfacts official website

References 

Business of visual arts
2001 establishments
Online databases